Reverse Logic is a rock album released by Jack Green in 1981.

Track listing
All songs by Jack Green, except noted

 "One By One" – 3:39
 "(Why Don't You) Let Me Go" – 4:24
 "Cold Modern Day" – 3:52
 "When I Was Young" (Jack Green, Leslie Adey) – 3:23
 "It's A Hard World" – 3:52
 "Let It Rock" – 2:56
 "Too Many Fools"  – 3:05
 "Set Me Free"  – 3:42
 "Brave Madonna"  – 3:28
 "Sign of The Times" (Jack Green, Pete Tolson) – 5:24
 "Promises" – 3:31

1981 albums
RCA Records albums